Ma Zhong (died 249), courtesy name Dexin, originally named Hu Du, was a military general of the state of Shu Han during the Three Kingdoms period of China. Liu Bei was quite impressed by Ma Zhong and praised him highly, comparing him to the recently defected Huang Quan, Ma Zhong was trusted and respected by the following head of the government Zhuge Liang, Jiang Wan and Fei Yi. After Liu Bei's death, he served under Zhuge Liang during the Southern Campaign and helped to quell the rebellion. He was appointed as the area commander in the south after Li Hui's death. He spends most of his life pacify the region and protecting the people of the south often with the help of Zhang Ni. Ma Zhong was known as a generous and whimsical man but he was also decisive in handling affairs. Hence the southern tribes both feared him and respected him.  His duty in the south could be comparable to Wang Ping in the north and Deng Zhi in the east. After his death, the foreigners sorely missed him and later established a temple in his honor.

Early life
Ma Zhong was from Langzhong County (閬中), Baxi Commandery (巴西), which is located within present-day Sichuan. When Ma Zhong was a child, he was raised and adopted by his mother's family, hence he was surnamed Hu and named Du. Ma Zhong afterward returned to his surname (back to Ma), and changed his name to Zhong. He became a commandery clerk, at the End of the Han dynasty (196-220). After distinguishing himself in civil affairs, Ma Zhong was later nominated as xiàolián “filial and incorrupt” and sent out as Chief of Hànchāng.

Meeting Liu Bei
When Liu Bei led an eastern campaign in 222 and was defeated at the Battle of Xiaoting. The Administrator of Baxī, Yan Zhi (閻芝) sent from all the various counties soldiers. And raised 5 000 men as replacements for losses during the battle. Then, he put them under Ma Zhong's command to deliver them. Liu Bei had already returned to Yufu County (魚復縣; present-day Fengjie County, Chongqing), which he renamed "Yong'an" (永安; literally "everlasting peace"). While he was there and under the recommendation of his Director of the Secretariat Liu Ba, he personally met Ma Zhong and spoke with him of political affairs. Liu Bei was so impressed by Ma Zhong that he said to Liu Ba :

Service under Zhuge Liang
When Liu Bei died in 223, he named Zhuge Liang and Li Yan as regents to support Liu Shan. The Chancellor Zhuge Liang opened his office and heard of Liu Bei's endorsement of Ma Zhong's talents. So, he appointed him as Commander Beneath the Gates (門下督). Zhuge Liang was further impressed by Ma Zhong's good conduct.

In 225, Zhuge Liang launched a campaign against Yong Kai (雍闓)’s rebellion also known as Zhuge Liang's Southern Campaign, and appointed Ma Zhong as the Administrator of Zangke (牂牁太守), which had been in rebellion since the commander Deputy Zhu Bao (朱褒) defected in 223. After two years of constant revolt, the commandery was unruly yet Ma Zhong quickly quelled the rebels and pacified the region. As the Administrator, he remained in the commandery and helped the region to recover. He proved his skills as he brought relief to his people and a harmonious government. Among the people of the region, Ma Zhong deeply had authority and kindness.

For the next five years, Ma Zhong stayed in Zhangke and helped to restore peace and prosperity to the commandery. However, in 230, Zhuge Liang summoned him to be an Advisor to the Army in Zhuge Liang's Northern Expeditions and assisted the Chief Clerk Jiang Wan’s in the gouvernement's affairs during the defense of Shu. For his accomplishments, Ma Zhong was given an office as Advisor in Provincial Internal Government.

Next year, in 231. Zhuge Liang set out against the foreign tribes Qishan. Ma Zhong visited where Zhuge Liàng was and helped him in the military affairs. Then, he led the army with the Commanding General Zhang Ni and others to quelled the rebelling Qiang in Wenshan Commandery (汶山郡). The Qiang people set up stone gate among the mountains and accumulate stones atop the gate in order to resist the attack of the Shu Han army. Ma Zhong send the general Zhang Ni as the vanguard to attack them.Then, Zhang Ni used an emissary to scare them into submission. Some of the them surrender while the rest fled to the valley. Ma Zhong and Zhang Ni hunted those who fled and achieved total victory.

Subjugating southern tribes
In 233, the southern foreigner Liu Zhou (劉胄) gathered support among the many tribes and rebelled. His rebellion was such that it disturbed most of the commanderies. The Area Commander of Nanzhong (庲降都督) Zhang Yi (Bogong) was unable to quell the rebellion and summoned back. However before returning, Zhang Yi gathered supplies to help Ma Zhong and make sure his army was well provided. Ma Zhong was sent to succeed him. Ma Zhong thereupon led his army and defeated the rebel army, and finally beheaded Liu Zhou. With his victory, he pacified the southern lands. Ma Zhong was given additional office as Supervisor of the Army and General Exerting Authority with a fief as Marquis of Bóyáng Village (彭鄉亭侯).

Before Ma Zhong arrived and during Yong Kai's rebellion. In Jianning Commandery (建寧郡), the rebels killed the administrator, Zheng Ang (正昂), and bounded the other administrator, Zhang Yi, but they did not dare to kill him so instead they sent him as a captive to Eastern Wu; therefore the commander by fear had always garrisoned away in Pingyi county. But when Ma Zhong became Commander, he refused to do this and moved his headquarters to Wei County, Handan residing among the Han population and foreigners. At the same time, Yuexī Commandery  (越巂郡) had long been lost territory. And so to retake it, Ma Zhong led with the vanguard general Zhang Ni a victorious campaign against the various tribes and was able to restore the old commandery. For his help, Ma Zhong was promoted to General Who Stabilises the South (安南將軍) and advanced in fief to Marquis of Péngxiāng Village (彭鄉亭侯).

Later life
In 242, Nanzhong was again a calm territory and Ma Zhong was called back to Chengdu to the Court. At this time, Jiang Wan wanted to change the road to attack Wei but most of the court officials were against this idea fearing that a retreat wouldn't be possible if the army met difficulty therefore Ma Zhong was chosen to deliver the Imperial Order. He was sent to Hanzhong and met the Marshal-in-Chief Jiang Wan and helped to oversee the defenses against Cao Wei. Jiang Wan also promoted him to Senior General Who Guards the South (鎮南大將軍).

Two years later, in the spring of 244. A large Wei army under the command of Cao Shuang attacked Hanzhong at the Battle of Xingshi. Wang Ping commanded the initial defenses however the General-in-Chief Fei Yi wanted to lead reinforcements to the north. During this time, Ma Zhong was put in charge of the government affairs in Chengdu, Ma Zhong repaid Fei Yi's trust and did well during his absence. When Fei Yi returned, he sent Ma Zhong back to protect the south against the raid of the tribal tribes.

Ma Zhong stayed in the south and kept the land peaceful for another 5 years. He died in 249 and was greatly mourned by all of the people of Nanzhong, foreign clans and Han people.

Family
Ma Zhong had three sons: Ma Xiu (馬脩), Ma Hui (馬恢) and Ma Rong (馬融). His son Ma Xiu succeeded him. While Xiu's younger brother Ma Hui has his son Ma Yi (馬義) served as the Administrator of Jianning County during the Jin dynasty.

Appraisal and successors
Chen Shou, who wrote Ma Zhong's biography in the Records of the Three Kingdoms (Sanguozhi), appraised him as follows: "Ma Zhong was at the same time gentle yet resolute... Along with Huang Quan, Li Hui, Lü Kai, Wang Ping, Zhang Ni, It was thanks to their qualities that they were all well known through the empire and because they seized the opportunity given to them that they left strong legacies."

Ma Zhong as a man was generous and benevolent in his treatment of people however he was also whimsical and liked to tease others then greatly laughed. Yet when he was furious, he would not let him be apparent. When he handled civil and military affairs he was decisive and would show both authority and kindness. Therefore the foreigners both awed and loved him. When he died, all of them were present in the funeral hall and wept for him with utmost sorrow. They established for him a Temple to commemorate his memory.

Chang Qu in the Huayang Guo Zhi stated that when he was administering the south, Ma Zhong showed kindness to those afar and helpfulness to those close to him. To everyone, he showed great concern and magnanimity. For his effort, his highest position was Senior General Who Guards the South, a position that (except him) none of the governors of the southern lands would attain. After Ma Zhong's death, the people of the south built a shrine in his honor and would pray to him in time of hardship.

Zhang Biao, was a famous scholar whose reputation for refinement surpassed Ma Zhong. Yet with the possible exception of Li Hui or Huo Yi, Ma Zhong was the most popular area commander for Shu-Han's southern lands. Yan Yu (閻宇), whose courtesy name was Wenping (文平) showed ability and would easily achieve his objectives while being diligent and conscientious in the civil affairs. Along with Zhang Biao, they were in charge of administering the south after Ma Zhong's death. However, their authority and merits both never reached those of Ma Zhong.

Zhang Biao was from the Shu Commandery (蜀郡) and was chosen to administer the south after Ma Zhong. He succeeded Ma Zhong's position as the General Who Stabilises the South. To help him, Yang Xi (楊羲) of Qianwei Commandery (犍為郡) joined him in his mission and was appointed as his deputy.

See also
 Lists of people of the Three Kingdoms

References

 Chen, Shou (3rd century). Records of the Three Kingdoms (Sanguozhi).
 Chang Qu (4th century). Chronicles of Huayang (Huayang Guo Zhi).
 Pei, Songzhi (5th century). Annotations to Records of the Three Kingdoms (Sanguozhi zhu).

Year of birth unknown
249 deaths
Shu Han generals
People from Langzhong
Politicians from Nanchong
Shu Han politicians
Political office-holders in Guizhou
Generals from Sichuan